"For the Future" is Do As Infinity's nineteenth single, released in 2005.

This song was included in the band's compilation album Do the A-side.

Track listing
"For the Future"
"For the Future" (Instrumental)

Chart positions

External links
 "For the Future" at Avex Network
 "For the Future" at Oricon

2005 singles
Do As Infinity songs
Songs written by Dai Nagao
Songs written by Ryo Owatari
Song recordings produced by Seiji Kameda
2005 songs
Avex Trax singles